The Republic of Zimbabwe is broken down into 10 administrative provinces, which are divided into 59 districts and 1,200 wards.

Bulawayo Province

 Bulawayo

Harare Province

 Harare

Manicaland Province

 Buhera
 Chimanimani
 Chipinge
 Makoni
 Mutare
 Mutasa
 Nyanga

Mashonaland Central Province

 Bindura
 Guruve
 Mazowe
 Mbire
 Mount Darwin
 Muzarabani
 Mukumbura
 Rushinga
 Shamva

Mashonaland East Province

 Chikomba
 Goromonzi
 Marondera
 Mudzi
 Murehwa
 Mutoko
 Seke
 UMP (Uzumba-Maramba-Pfungwe)
 Wedza (Hwedza)

Mashonaland West Province

 Chegutu
 Hurungwe
 Kariba
 Makonde
 Mhondoro-Ngezi
 Sanyati
 Zvimba
 Kadoma
 Chinhoyi

Masvingo Province

 Bikita
 Chiredzi
 Chivi
 Gutu
 Masvingo
 Mwenezi
 Zaka

Matabeleland North Province

 Binga
 Bubi
 Hwange
 Lupane
 Nkayi
 Tsholotsho
 Umguza

Matabeleland South Province

 Beitbridge
 Bulilima
 Gwanda
 Insiza
 Mangwe
 Matobo
 Umzingwane

Midlands Province

 Chirumhanzu
 Gokwe North
 Gokwe South
 Gweru
 Kwekwe
 Mberengwa
 Shurugwi
 Zvishavane

See also
 Provinces of Zimbabwe
 Wards of Zimbabwe

External links
 Map of Districts of Zimbabwe

 
Zimbabwe
Zimbabwe
Zimbabwe
Subdivisions of Zimbabwe
Zimbabwe geography-related lists